The KrAZ H27.3EX or KrAZ 7634HE off-road truck 8x8 is manufactured at the KrAZ plant in Ukraine.  It was first presented in the 2014 year. 

KrAZ 7634HE is provided engine YaMZ-7511.10 rated at 400 hp, the YaMZ-184 clutch and the YaMZ-2391-53 mechanical transmission.

First and second axles are steerable, all the axles are driving.

Technical characteristics 
Engine: YaMZ-7511.10 14.86 L diesel V8 cyl. (Euro 3III)
Power: 400 PS (294 kW) /1900 rpm
Torque: 1715 Nm /1100-1300 rpm
Transmission: mechanical YaMZ-2391-53
Clutch: single disk YaMZ-184
Minimum turning radius: 14 m
Axle configuration: 8x8
Tires: 445/65R22,5
Payload: 27,000 kg

References

External links
Official website
КрАЗ-7634НЕ video

KrAZ vehicles
Cars of Ukraine
All-wheel-drive vehicles
Military vehicles introduced in the 2010s